Caladenia flava subsp. sylvestris, commonly known as the karri cowslip orchid, is a species of orchid endemic to the south-west of Western Australia. It has a single, hairy leaf and up to three pale yellow and cream-coloured flowers which are white near the tips of the sepals and petals and marked with bright red or pink.

Description 
The sepals and petals are pale lemon-yellow grading to white near their tips with a line of bright red or pink marks along the mid-line. The lateral lobes are egg-shaped, sometimes with four to six club-shaped teeth. The middle lobe has four to six erect teeth and there are two rows of calli along its centre forming a U-shape. Flowering occurs from October to December.

This subspecies differs from subspecies flava in its taller flowering stems and later (about six weeks) flowering. It differs from subspecies maculata in its more southerly distribution, taller flowering stems and paler-coloured flowers.

Taxonomy and naming
Caladenia flava was first formally described in 1810 by Robert Brown and the description was published in Brown's book Prodromus Florae Novae Hollandiae et Insulae Van Diemen. In 2001, Stephen Hopper and Andrew Phillip Brown described three subspecies of Caladenia flava including Caladenia flava subsp. sylvestris and published the descriptions in Nuytsia. The specific epithet (sylvestris) is a Latin word meaning "of woods" referring to the habitat preference of this species.

Distribution and habitat
Karri cowslip orchid grows in forests, especially high-rainfall karri forests between Bunbury and Albany in the Esperance Plains, Jarrah Forest and Warren biogeographic regions.

Conservation
Caladenia flava subsp. sylvestris is classified as "not threatened" by the Western Australian Government Department of Parks and Wildlife.

References

flava
Orchids of Western Australia
Endemic orchids of Australia
Plants described in 1810
Taxa named by Stephen Hopper
Taxa named by Andrew Phillip Brown